The montane shrew tenrec (Microgale monticola) is a species of mammal in the family Tenrecidae. It is endemic to Madagascar. Its natural habitat is subtropical or tropical moist montane forests.

References

Afrosoricida
Mammals of Madagascar
Mammals described in 1998
Taxonomy articles created by Polbot